The term Lord Mayor of Newcastle may apply to:

The Lord Mayor of Newcastle-upon-Tyne, England
The Lord Mayor of Newcastle (New South Wales)

See also

The Mayor of Newcastle-under-Lyme